Ypthima chenu, the Nilgiri fourring, is a species of Satyrinae butterfly found in south India.

Description 

Charles Thomas Bingham (1905) gives a detailed description as follows:

Gallery

References 

chenui
Butterflies of Asia
Butterflies described in 1843